Damon Plimmer is an Anglican priest. He is the Archdeacon of Central Otago, one of four Archdeaconries in the Anglican Diocese of Dunedin which serves a portion of New Zealand's South Island.

He was a priest at Wellington Cathedral and later the Vicar of Eastbourne then Upper Clutha. He was collated on 28 October 2015.

References

Archdeacons of Central Otago
Living people
Year of birth missing (living people)